USS Dewey (DDG-105) is an  guided missile destroyer in the United States Navy. Dewey is the third Navy ship named after Admiral of the Navy George Dewey, hero of the Battle of Manila Bay during the Spanish–American War.

The ship is part of Destroyer Squadron 1 of Carrier Strike Group One of which the flagship is aircraft carrier .

History

She was authorized on 13 September 2002 and was built by Northrop Grumman Ship Systems. The keel was laid down on 4 October 2006 at the company's shipyard in Pascagoula, Mississippi. On 26 January 2008, Dewey was christened in a ceremony in Pascagoula, by Deborah Mullen, the wife of Admiral Mike Mullen. Dewey was commissioned in Seal Beach, California on 6 March 2010, as the 55th Arleigh Burke-class destroyer. This is the first ship commissioning for the City of Seal Beach.

In April 2013, Dewey was outfitted with a Laser Weapon System (LaWS). This is an experimental weapon which can be used to disable small boats and drones.

On 26 May 2017, Dewey carried out a "freedom of navigation operation" (FONOP) in waters claimed by China in the South China Sea. According to Chinese sources, Dewey was expelled from Chinese waters near the Nansha Islands in the South China Sea. According to the US Navy, the FONOP proceeded as planned by peacefully transiting the area, despite verbal challenges and approaches by Chinese vessels.

On 16 June 2017, Dewey got underway to assist  after a collision with the Japanese-owned (NYK Line) Philippine-flagged container ship . On 4 September 2017, she deployed to the Port of Los Angeles as part of the 2017 fleet week activities. In October 2017, Dewey spilled oil near the Tijuana River.

In early 2020 the Optical Dazzling Interdictor laser weapon was installed on Dewey. She was the first ship to receive the new weapons system.

Deployments
 29 July 2011 – 27 February 2012 Maiden deployment
 22 August 2014 – 4 June 2015 West Pac-Indian Ocean-Persian Gulf
31 March 2017 – 31 July 2017 Western Pacific
6 February 2018 – 11 May 2018 Western Pacific

Awards

Navy Unit Commendation - (Sep 2011-Jan 2012, Jul 2012-May 2013)
Battle "E" - (2018, 2019, 2021)
Spokane Trophy Award - (2018)

References

External links

 Official Ship's Site
 Dewey Commissioning
 City of Seal Beach

 

Arleigh Burke-class destroyers
Ships built in Pascagoula, Mississippi
2008 ships